"Action" is a song written by Tommy Boyce and Steve Venet, which was the theme song to the TV series Where the Action Is, and a 1965 hit for Freddy Cannon.

References

1965 singles
Warner Records singles
Songs written by Tommy Boyce
1965 songs
Music television series theme songs
Song recordings produced by Dick Glasser